Maximum Security is the third novel in the CHERUB series of books, written by Robert Muchamore. In this novel CHERUB agents James Adams and Dave Moss infiltrate a maximum security prison in Arizona to get to the son of an international arms dealer.

Plot
Lauren completes basic training successfully, to the displeasure of the sadistic Norman Large, whom Lauren injured with a shovel in the previous novel.

James is offered a role on a major mission. He is joined by Dave Moss, a well-respected CHERUB agent with a reputation for womanising, and Lauren. The FBI have discovered that Curtis Key, a 14-year-old boy imprisoned in an Arizona maximum security prison for murder, is the son of Jane Oxford, an international arms dealer who has evaded capture for decades. With the help of the FBI, James and Dave go undercover into the prison posing as brothers who accidentally ran over a homeless woman in their getaway car, with the intention of breaking Curtis out in the hope that he will lead the FBI to his mother.

James soon befriends Curtis, but within days of arriving Dave is injured in an altercation with prison officers, leaving James with the sole responsibility of breaking Curtis out. The escape goes smoothly and Curtis and James are picked up by Lauren, who is posing as James and Dave's sister. The three are stopped by police officers and Curtis attempts to kill himself with an unloaded gun, but James and Lauren overpower the officers. They kidnap a woman and force her to drive them to Los Angeles. Upon arrival, Curtis contacts his father, a major breakthrough as the FBI did not know who he was previously. The trio are taken to a ranch in Idaho to stay with Vaughn Little, a former weapons dealer and associate of Jane Oxford. During their stay, James strikes up a relationship with Little's daughter Becky, to Lauren's disgust, as he is still dating Kerry. From there they are taken to Boise, where two of Jane Oxford's henchmen give the three new identities. The henchmen explain that Curtis will travel to Brazil while James and Lauren will be given a new life in Canada. However, Oxford has planned to kill James and Lauren as witnesses to Curtis' escape, and after Curtis leaves for the airport with one of the henchmen, the other one attempts to kill Lauren, who successfully incapacitates him. The FBI follow Curtis, but instead of going to the airport, Curtis goes to a motel where Oxford has come for him in person. Oxford is arrested, concluding the mission as a success.

James, Dave (still recovering from his injuries), and Lauren return home to CHERUB campus. In the epilogue, Oxford refuses to co-operate with authorities and is remanded in ADX Florence, and is expected to face life in prison. Little is also incarcerated, while Oxford's henchmen are sentenced to death. Curtis' sentence is reduced after it is found that a psychiatrist took a bribe to recommend Curtis to the military school where the incident that precipitated his killing spree occurred. Lauren earns her navy shirt for her performance on the mission, and James, Lauren and Dave are awarded the Intelligence Star for their serivce.

Characters

Critical reception 
Maximum Security received better reviews than its predecessor, Class A and received two awards.

Awards

References

External links 
 UK page of CHERUB website for book
 USA page of CHERUB website for book

CHERUB novels
2005 British novels
Novels set in Arizona
Hodder & Stoughton books